Dmytro Mykolayovych Smolych (11 April 191928 April 1987) was a Soviet and Ukrainian theatre director.

Early years
Smolych was born in Petrograd (now Saint Petersburg), in the Russian Soviet Federative Socialist Republic. He was the son of the theatre director Mykola Smolych. In 1941, he graduated from the K. Stanislavsky Opera and Drama Studio in Moscow.

Career and notable productions
From 19411955, he directed the National Opera of Ukraine (becoming its chief director in 1970). He directed the Chelyabinsk Opera and Ballet Theatre from 19551958, when he became the chief director of the Odesa Opera and Ballet Theatre. In 1962 he became art director of the Minsk Theatre, a post he held for seven years. In 1969 he became chief director at the Lviv Theatre of Opera and Ballet, holding the post for a year. From 1970 he was the chief director of the Ukrainian Opera and Ballet Theatre.

Later life

Smolych spent much of his later life in Kyiv, and there is a bronze memorial plaque dedicated to him at 39 Bohdan Khmelnytskyi Street, where he lived and worked from 1971 to 1987. He died in Kyiv on April 28, 1987. He is buried next to his father in Baikove Cemetery.

Honours
He was an Honoured Artist of the Georgian SSR (1957), Honored Artist of the RSFSR (1958). People's Artist of the Ukrainian SSR (1960),  (1964), Laureate of the Taras Shevchenko State Prize of the Ukrainian SSR (1970), and People's Artist of the USSR (1979).

References

Further reading
 Information about Smolych from the National Opera of Ukraine website (in Ukrainian)
 Biography from kino-teatr.ru (in Russian)
 Biography from the National Opera and Ballet of Belarus website (in Russian)

Ukrainian theatre directors
Soviet theatre directors
1919 births
1987 deaths
Theatre directors from Saint Petersburg
Burials at Baikove Cemetery